"Beer for My Horses" is a song recorded by American country music artists Toby Keith and Willie Nelson. It was written by Keith and Scotty Emerick for Keith's seventh studio album, Unleashed. The song was released as the album's fourth and final single on April 7, 2003.

"Beer for My Horses" received mixed reviews from music critics. The single reached #22 on the Billboard Hot 100, making it Keith's highest charting song of his career at the time. The song also peaked at #1 for six weeks in the US Billboard Hot Country Songs (one of two songs to stay that long at #1 for Toby Keith). Becoming Keith's 11th #1 hit and Nelson's 23rd and his first since "Nothing I Can Do About It Now" in 1989. "Beer for My Horses" was certified Platinum once by the Recording Industry Association of America (RIAA).

The accompanying music video was directed by Michael Salomon and premiered on CMT on April 9, 2003, during CMT Smash Hits of Country.

"Beer for My Horses" also made Willie Nelson the oldest artist to top the country charts at age 70.

The phrase, "Whisky for me beer for my horse" is said in the 1975 film, Bite the Bullet, by Jan-Michael Vincent.

Content

The song expresses frustration at an ineffectual justice system's inability to address crimes such as theft, abuse, and "gangsters doing dirty deeds.”

Music video
The music video for the song features Toby Keith, Willie Nelson, and Corin Nemec, as detectives hunting a serial killer, played by Gregg Gilmore. The detectives eventually convince Nemec to dress up as a woman to lure the serial killer and they end up capturing him. The video, directed by Michael Salomon, was shot in downtown Los Angeles and at the nearby Golden Oak Ranch, in Newhall, California. It is also the first video in which Keith does not actually sing. On March 4, 2004, the video was nominated for Video of the Year for the Academy of Country Music Awards.

In popular culture
The 2008 film Beer for My Horses was based on the song, which was featured in the film. The film starred Keith and Nelson, among others. The song was also used in an episode of Lethal Weapon in 2016. It won the award for Video of the Year in May later that year. 

In 2021, U.S. Representative Chip Roy of Texas caused controversy by unknowingly quoting a lyric from the song that seemed to invoke lynching while he was serving on a committee concerned about an increase in hate crimes towards Asian-Americans. At the time Roy claimed the line was "an old saying in Texas" but later admitted it was from the Keith song.

Critical reception
Stephen Thomas Erlewine of AllMusic found the song to be "absurdly anthemic".

Chart and sales performance

"Beer for My Horses" entered the Hot Country Singles & Tracks charts dated for the week ending August 3, 2002, spending three weeks on the charts as an album cut and peaking at #54. It re-entered at #60 on the chart dated February 1, 2003. On the Billboard Hot 100, it ended up peaking at #22. Along with "Who's Your Daddy?", it was tied for his highest peaking song on the chart until "Red Solo Cup" beat it out in 2012 by peaking at #15.  The song reached over a million in sales in April 2014.  As of January 2017, the song has sold 1,178,000 copies in the United States.

Charts and certifications

Year-end charts

Certifications

Other
A film adaptation of the song entered production in mid-2008, and was released on August 8, 2008.

The song is available as downloadable content for the game Rock Band.

References

2003 singles
2002 songs
Toby Keith songs
Willie Nelson songs
Male vocal duets
Songs written by Scotty Emerick
Music videos directed by Michael Salomon
Songs written by Toby Keith
Song recordings produced by James Stroud
DreamWorks Records singles
Songs about alcohol
Songs about horses